List of ships built by Aberdeen shipbuilders Hall, Russell & Company, from yard number 601 to 700.

The ships built in the sequence 601 to 700 cover the period 1917 — 1929. The majority of vessels built during this period were armed trawlers for the Admiralty, fishing vessels for British owners, and a number of cargo vessels, such as those built for the North of Scotland, Orkney & Shetland Steam Navigation Company.

Notes
 Where available, vessel measurements taken from Lloyd's Register, giving registered length, beam and draft. Hall, Russell and Company's own measurements typically are length overall, beam and moulded depth.
 Yard Numbers 602-605 unused
 Yard Numbers 638-641 likely allocated to the cancelled order for four additional Kil-class sloops. Two built (636 and 637), third vessel, HMS Kilcavan was named but cancelled and three other vessels were cancelled before being named.
 Yard Numbers 658-672 likely allocated to additional trawlers for Admiralty, cancelled at the end of World War I
 Yard Number 681 unused

References

Bibliography

Ships built in Scotland